Project Venezuela is a center-right political party in Venezuela.

At the legislative elections, 30 July 2000, the party won seven out of 165 seats in the National Assembly of Venezuela. The legislative elections of 2006 were boycotted by the party. The leader is Henrique Salas Römer who was a Presidential Candidate in the 1998 elections.

Its current president is Salas Römer's son, Henrique Salas Feo, former governor of Carabobo. It is a full member of the IDU.

For the 2017 and 2018 elections, the party withdrew from participating, saying that the CNE's process was too demanding.

References

Political parties in Venezuela
International Democrat Union member parties
Christian democratic parties in South America
Christian democratic parties in Venezuela
Political parties established in 1998
1998 establishments in Venezuela